"This Night" is a song performed by female English dance music duo Booty Luv. They debuted off a video for the song in late October 2011. The song was then released seven months later as a promotional single on 24 May 2012 through recording label Industry Sound.

Background
"This Night" was written and produced by Ian Green and co-produced by Richard D. Pierce. The music video for "This Night" was first uploaded on 31 October, and is directed by Moonrunners.

References

External links

2011 songs
2011 singles
Booty Luv songs